Mohamed Bellahmed, better known by his stage name Moha La Squale (born in Créteil, France on 24 February 1995) is a French/Algerian rapper. His first name Moha is derived from his birth name Mohamed and La Squale is the nickname of his big brother in the neighborhood. He gained fame through publishing freestyles every Sunday on his Facebook page. Signed to Elektra France, an affiliate of Warner Bros Records, in August 2017, he released his debut album Bendero that topped the French Albums Chart and also charted in Belgium and Switzerland. A great number of the tracks charting on SNEP, the official French Singles Chart. In 2018 he collaborated with French sportswear brand Lacoste to create a limited collection (Lacoste X Moha la Squale). However, after being investigated for sexual abuse he was dropped by the label.

Discography

Albums

Singles

*Did not appear in the official Belgian Ultratop 50 charts, but rather in the bubbling under Ultratip charts.

Other charted songs

*Did not appear in the official Belgian Ultratop 50 charts, but rather in the bubbling under Ultratip charts.

References

French rappers
French people of Algerian descent
1995 births
Living people
People from Créteil